Wickham Common is a village in the civil parish of Wickham in the City of Winchester district of Hampshire, England. Its nearest town is Fareham, which lies approximately 3.1 miles (5 km) south from the village. It is in the civil parish of Boarhunt

Villages in Hampshire